Events during the year 1997 in Northern Ireland.

Incumbents
 Secretary of State - Patrick Mayhew (until 3 May), Mo Mowlam (from 3 May)

Events
March - The first phase of the Forestside Shopping Centre in Belfast opens with a new Sainsbury's store.
1 May - 1997 United Kingdom general election.
3 July - Taoiseach Bertie Ahern meets Prime Minister Tony Blair for the first time.
6–11 July - 1997 nationalist riots in Northern Ireland: There is violence in nationalist areas after an Orange Order parade is allowed down the Garvaghy Road by the Royal Ulster Constabulary in Portadown as part of the Drumcree conflict.
20 July - The Provisional Irish Republican Army institutes a second ceasefire.
7 October - Substantial all-party talks begin in Northern Ireland.
10 October - At a Provisional IRA General Army Convention held at Falcarragh, County Donegal, a majority supports the ceasefire.
26 October - Provisional IRA Executive members opposed to the ceasefire including Michael McKevitt and Bernadette Sands McKevitt resign.
November - Dissident IRA members led by Michael McKevitt meet at a farmhouse in Oldcastle, County Meath, and form a new organisation of Óglaigh na hÉireann, which becomes known as the Real Irish Republican Army.
27 December - Loyalist Volunteer Force leader Billy Wright is shot dead in the Maze prison by members of the Irish National Liberation Army.

Arts and literature
26 August - U2 play their first Belfast concert in over a decade as part of the PopMart Tour. 40,000 fans attend the concert in Belfast Botanic Gardens.
Ciarán Carson's The Star Factory is published and wins The Yorkshire Post Book Award (Book of the Year).
Seamus Deane's first novel, Reading in the Dark (published in 1996), is shortlisted for the Booker Prize and wins The Irish Times International Fiction Prize and The Irish Literature Prize.
Waterfront Hall concert and conference venue in Belfast is completed.

Sport

Football
Irish League
Winners: Crusaders

Irish Cup
Winners: Glenavon 1 - 0 Cliftonville

League of Ireland
Winners: Derry City

FAI Cup
Winners: Shelbourne 2 - 0 Derry City

Births
SOAK, born Bridie Monds-Watson, singer-songwriter.

Deaths
7 January - Patricia McLaughlin, Ulster Unionist Party MP (b.1916).
7 March - Geraldine Clinton Little, poet (b.1923).
17 April - Chaim Herzog, sixth President of Israel (1983–1993) (b.1918).
2 May - Robin Kinahan, Unionist politician and businessman (b.1916).
22 July - Vincent Hanna, television journalist (b.1939).
22 August - Brendan Smyth, Roman Catholic priest and convicted child sexual abuser (b.1927).
4 October - Sheila McGibbon, actress (b.1921).
27 December - Billy Wright, leader of the Loyalist Volunteer Force (b.1960; k. in prison).
29 December - John Graham, Irish Republican Army activist in 1940s (b.1915).
Kennedy Lindsay - Vanguard Progressive Unionist Party politician and British Ulster Dominion Party leader (b.1924 in Canada).

See also
1997 in England
1997 in Scotland
1997 in Wales

References

 
Northern Ireland